Hanna Kostivna Lypkivska (18 May 1967 – 24 March 2021) was a Ukrainian theatrologist.

Biography
She taught at the Kyiv National I. K. Karpenko-Kary Theatre, Cinema and Television University.

Lypkivska died in Kyiv on 24 March 2021, aged 53 from COVID-19 during the COVID-19 pandemic in Ukraine.

References

Theatrologists
Ukrainian women writers
Ukrainian women journalists
1967 births
2021 deaths
Place of birth missing
Deaths from the COVID-19 pandemic in Ukraine